King Tut is a colloquial name for Tutankhamun, an Egyptian pharaoh.

King Tut may also refer to:
King Tut (comics), a character from the Batman TV series
"King Tut" (song), a novelty song by Steve Martin

See also